Eremophila hughesii is a flowering plant in the figwort family, Scrophulariaceae and is endemic to Australia. It is spindly, glabrous shrub with narrow leaves and with flowers that vary in colour from blue to pink, sometimes white. It is native to Western Australia and the Northern Territory.

Description
The leaves are arranged alternately and often widely spaced along the branches.

The petal tube is white to pale lilac, often darker lilac-coloured on the top and cream to yellowish with purple spots inside. The outside of the tube and petal lobes are hairy but the inside of the lobes is glabrous and the inside of the tube is woolly. The 4 stamens are fully enclosed in the petal tube.

Taxonomy and naming 
The species was first formally described in 1874 by Victorian Government Botanist Ferdinand von Mueller in his Fragmenta Phytographiae Australiae based on plant material collected between Barrow Range and Rawlinson Range during Ernest Giles's expedition. The specific epithet (hughesii) honours Sir Walter Hughes, the founder of the University of Adelaide.

Two subspecies are recognized in the Australian Plant Census:
Eremophila hughesii F.Muell. subsp. hughesii which occurs from Laverton to the extreme west of the Northern Territory in the Gascoyne, Gibson Desert and Murchison biogeographic regions;
Eremophila hughesii subsp. sanguinensis Chinnock - from the western part of Bloods Range in the Northern Territory.

Distribution and habitat
Eremophila hughesii grows in sand and gravelly soils on sandplains and rocky ridges usually in mulga woodland or spinifex grassland.

Conservation status
Eremophila hughesii is classified as "not threatened" by the Western Australian Government Department of Parks and Wildlife.

Use in horticulture
The open, spindly growth form of this eremophila limits its appeal although young specimens can be attractive. It can be propagated from cuttings or by grafting onto Myoporum rootstock and grows best in well-drained soil in a sunny or partially shaded position. Although it is drought tolerant, it is sensitive to frost.

References

hughesii
Flora of the Northern Territory
Eudicots of Western Australia
Plants described in 1874
Taxa named by Ferdinand von Mueller